Malinowo - settlement located in Poland, West Pomeranian Voivodeship, Gmina Będzino.

References

Villages in Koszalin County